Styrax (common names storax or snowbell) is a genus of about 130 species of large shrubs or small trees in the family Styracaceae, mostly native to warm temperate to tropical regions of the Northern Hemisphere, with the majority in eastern and southeastern Asia, but also crossing the equator in South America. The resin obtained from the tree is called benzoin or storax (not to be confused with the Liquidambar storax balsam).

The genus Pamphilia, sometimes regarded as distinct, is now included within Styrax based on analysis of morphological and DNA sequence data. The spicebush (Lindera benzoin) is a different plant, in the family Lauraceae.

Styrax trees grow to 2–14 m tall, and have alternate, deciduous or evergreen simple ovate leaves 1–18 cm long and 2–10 cm broad. The flowers are pendulous, with a white 5–10-lobed corolla, produced 3–30 together on open or dense panicles 5–25 cm long. The fruit is an oblong dry drupe, smooth and lacking ribs or narrow wings, unlike the fruit of the related snowdrop trees (Halesia) and epaulette trees (Pterostyrax).

Uses

Uses of resin
Benzoin resin, a dried exudation from pierced bark, is currently produced from various Styrax species native to Sumatra, Java, and Thailand. Commonly traded are the resins of S. tonkinensis (Siam benzoin), S. benzoin (Sumatra benzoin), and S. benzoides. The name benzoin is probably derived from Arabic lubān jāwī (لبان جاوي, "Javan frankincense); compare the obsolete terms gum benjamin and benjoin. This incidentally shows that the Arabs were aware of the origin of these resins, and that by the late Middle Ages at latest international trade in them was probably of major importance.

The chemical benzoin (2-hydroxy-2-phenylacetophenone), despite the apparent similarity of the name, is not contained in benzoin resin in measurable quantities. However, benzoin resin does contain small amounts of the hydrocarbon styrene, named however for Levant storax (from Liquidambar orientalis), from which it was first isolated, and not for the genus Styrax itself;  industrially produced styrene is now used to produce polystyrene plastics, including Styrofoam.

History of sources

Since Antiquity, storax resin has been used in perfumes, certain types of incense, and medicines.

There is some degree of uncertainty as to exactly what resin old sources refer to. Turkish sweetgum (Liquidambar orientalis) is a quite unrelated tree in the family Altingiaceae that produces a similar resin traded in modern times as storax or as Levant storax,  like the resins of other sweetgums, and a number of confusing variations thereupon. Turkish sweetgum is a relict species that occurs only in a small area in SW Turkey (and not in the Levant at all); presumably, quite some of the "storax resin" of the Ancient Greek and the Ancient Roman sources was from this sweetgum, rather than a Styrax, although at least during the former era genuine Styrax resin, probably from S. officinalis, was imported in quantity from the Near East by Phoenician merchants, and Herodotus of Halicarnassus in the 5th century BC indicates that different kinds of storax were traded.

The nataf (נטף) of the incense sacred to Yahweh, mentioned in the Book of Exodus, is loosely translated by the Greek term staktē (στακτή,), or an unspecific "gum resin" or similar term. Nataf may have meant the resin of Styrax officinalis or of some other plant, perhaps Turkish sweetgum, which is unlikely to have been imported in quantity into the Near East.

Since the Middle Ages, Southeast Asian benzoin resins became increasingly available; today there is little international trade in S. officinalis resin and little production of Turkish sweetgum resin due to that species' decline in numbers.

Use as incense
Storax incense is used in the Middle East and adjacent regions as an air freshener. This was adopted in the European Papier d'Arménie. Though highly toxic benzene and formaldehyde are produced when burning Styrax incense (as with almost all organic substances), the amounts produced by burning a strip of Papier d'Arménie every 2–3 days are less than those achieved by many synthetic air fresheners. Storax resin from southern Arabian species was burned during frankincense (Boswellia resin) harvesting; it was said to drive away snakes:
"[The Arabians] gather frankincense by burning that storax which Phoenicians carry to Hellas; they burn this and so get the frankincense; for the spice-bearing trees are guarded by small winged snakes of varied color, many around each tree; these are the snakes that attack Egypt. Nothing except the smoke of storax will drive them away from the trees."

Medical uses
There has been little dedicated research into the medical properties of storax resin, but it has been used for long, and apparently with favorable results. It was important in Islamic medicine; Avicenna (Ibn Sina, ابن سینا) discusses S. officinalis it in his Al-Qanun fi al-Tibb (القانون في الطب, The Law of Medicine). He indicates that storax resin mixed with other antibiotic substances and hardening material gives a good dental restorative material. Benzoin resin is a component of the "Theriaca Andromachi Senioris", a Venice treacle recipe in the 1686 d'Amsterdammer Apotheek.

Tincture of benzoin is benzoin resin dissolved in alcohol. This and its numerous derived versions like lait virginal and friar's balsam were highly esteemed in 19th-century European cosmetics and other household purposes; they apparently had antibacterial properties.  Today tincture of benzoin is most often used in first aid for small injuries, as it acts as a disinfectant and local anesthetic and seems to promote healing.  Benzoin resin and its derivatives are also used as additives in cigarettes.

The antibiotic activity of benzoin resin seems mostly due to its abundant benzoic acid and benzoic acid esters, which were named after the resin; other less well known secondary compounds such as lignans like pinoresinol are likely significant too.

Horticultural uses

Several species of storax are popular ornamental trees in parks and gardens, especially S. japonicus and its cultivars such as 'Emerald Pagoda', and Styrax obassia.

Uses of wood
The wood of larger species is suitable for fine handicrafts. That of egonoki (エゴノキ, S. japonicus) is used to build kokyū (胡弓), the Japanese bowed instrument.

Ecology and conservation
The resin of Styrax acts to kill wound pathogens and deter herbivores. Consequently, for example, few Lepidoptera caterpillars eat storax compared to other plants. Those of the two-barred flasher (Astraptes fulgerator) were recorded on S. argenteus, but they do not seem to use it on a regular basis.

Some storax species have declined in numbers due to unsustainable logging and habitat degradation.  While most of these are classified as vulnerable (VU) by the IUCN, only four trees of the nearly extinct palo de jazmin (S. portoricensis) are known to survive at a single location. Although legally protected, this species could be wiped out by a single hurricane.

Selected species

 Styrax agrestis – China
 Styrax americanus – SE USA
 Styrax argenteus – N & S America
 Styrax argentifolius – China
 Styrax bashanensis – China
 Styrax benzoides – Thailand, S China
 Styrax benzoin – Sumatra
 Styrax calvescens – China
 Styrax camporum  – Brazil, Bolivia, Paraguay
 Styrax chinensis – China
Styrax chrysocalyx  – Brazil
 Styrax chrysocarpus – China
 Styrax confusus – China
 Styrax cordatus – Peru and Ecuador
 Styrax crotonoides – Malaysia
 Styrax dasyanthus – central China
 Styrax faberi – China
 Styrax ferrugineus – Braxil, Bolivia, Paraguay
 Styrax formosanus – China
 Styrax foveolaria – Peru and Ecuador
 Styrax fraserensis – Malaysia
 Styrax grandiflorus – China
 Styrax grandifolius – SE USA
 Styrax hainanensis – S China
 Styrax hemsleyanus – China
 Styrax hookeri – Himalaya
 Styrax huanus – China
 Styrax jaliscana – Mexico
 Styrax japonicus – Japan
 Styrax limpritchii – SW China (Yunnan)
 Styrax litseoides – Vietnam
 Styrax macranthus – China
 Styrax macrocarpus – China
 Styrax martii – Brazil
 Styrax obassia – Japan, China
 Styrax odoratissimus – China
 Styrax officinalis – SE Europe, SW Asia
 Styrax pentlandianus – Bolivia, Peru, Ecuador, Colombia
 Styrax perkinsiae – China
 Styrax peruvianus – Costa Rica, Panama, Colombia, Ecuador, Peru
 Styrax philadelphoides – China
 Styrax platanifolius – Texas, NE Mexico
 Styrax pohlii – Suriname, Brazil, Peru, Bolivia
 Styrax portoricensis – Puerto Rico
 Styrax redivivus – California
 Styrax roseus – China
 Styrax rugosus – China
 Styrax schweliense – W China
 Styrax serrulatus – Himalaya, SW China
 Styrax shiraianum – Japan
 Styrax suberifolius – China
 Styrax supaii – China
 Styrax tomentosus – Colombia, Ecuador and Peru
 Styrax tonkinensis – SE Asia
 Styrax veitchiorum – China
 Styrax vilcabambae – Peru
 Styrax wilsonii – W China
 Styrax wuyuanensis – China
 Styrax zhejiangensis – China

Footnotes

References

  (2006): Problems with DNA barcodes for species delimitation: 'ten species' of Astraptes fulgerator reassessed (Lepidoptera: Hesperiidae). Systematics and Biodiversity 4(2): 127–132. 
  (2001). Phylogeny and Biogeography of the Styracaceae. Int. J Plant Sci. 162(6, Supplement): S95–S116. 
  (c.440 BC): The Histories. Annotated HTML fulltext of 1921 A. D. Godley translation.
  (1997): Analytical Study of Free and Ester Bound Benzoic and Cinnamic Acids of Gum Benzoin Resins by GC-MS and HPLC-frit FAB-MS. Phytochem. Anal. 8(2): 63-73. 
  (2004): Ten species in one: DNA barcoding reveals cryptic species in the semitropical skipper butterfly Astraptes fulgerator. PNAS 101(41): 14812-14817.  PDF fulltext Supporting Appendices
  (1997). A revision of Styrax L. section Pamphilia (Mart. ex A. DC.) B. Walln. (Styracaceae). Annalen des Naturhistorischen Museums in Wien 99B: 681–720.

 
Medicinal plants
Ericales genera